Dinar Valeev (born c. 1996) is an international speedway rider from Russia.

Speedway career 
Valeev became a world champion when winning the Individual Ice Speedway World Championship in the 2021 Individual Ice Racing World Championship. Valeev defeated Igor Kononov in a race off after both riders finished on 36 points.

He had previously won two bronze medals in 2019 Individual Ice Racing World Championship and 2020 Individual Ice Racing World Championship.

References 

Russian speedway riders
1990s births
Year of birth uncertain
Living people